Fredericton North is a provincial electoral district for the Legislative Assembly of New Brunswick, Canada from 1973 to 2006, and was contested again in the 2014 New Brunswick general election. It was split between the ridings of Fredericton-Nashwaaksis and Fredericton-Fort Nashwaak from 2006 until 2014.

From 1974 to 2003, the riding consisted of the whole of the northside of the city of Fredericton.  From 2014, it contained only a subset of that former territory, namely the former towns of Devon and Nashwaaksis (excluding parts north of the Ring Road).

Members of the Legislative Assembly

Election results

2020–present

1974–2006

External links 
Website of the Legislative Assembly of New Brunswick

References

New Brunswick provincial electoral districts
Politics of Fredericton